Vladimir Sergeyevich Vavilov (born 4 August 1988) is a former Russian professional football player.

Club career
He played in the Russian Football National League for FC Khimki in 2006.

External links
 Career summary at Sportbox
 

1988 births
Living people
Russian footballers
Association football midfielders
FC Khimki players
FC Lokomotiv Moscow players